A telephone keypad is a keypad installed on a push-button telephone or similar telecommunication device for dialing a telephone number. It was standardized when the dual-tone multi-frequency signaling (DTMF) system was developed in the Bell System in the United States in the 1960s that replaced rotary dialing originally developed in electromechanical switching systems. Because of the installed abundance of rotary dial equipment well into the 1990s, many telephone keypads were also designed to produce loop-disconnect pulses electronically, and some could be optionally switched to produce either DTMF or pulses.

The development of the modern telephone keypad is attributed to research in the 1950s by Richard Deininger under the directorship of John Karlin at the Human Factors Engineering Department of Bell Labs. The contemporary keypad is laid out in a rectangular array of twelve push buttons arranged as four rows and three columns of keys. For military applications, a fourth, right-most column of keys was added for priority signaling in the Autovon system in the 1960s. Initially, between 1963 and 1968, the keypads for civilian subscriber service omitting the lower left and lower right keys that commonly are assigned to the star (✻) and number sign (#) signals, respectively. These keys were added to provide signals for anticipated data entry purposes in business applications, but found use in Custom Calling Services (CLASS) features installed in electronic switching systems.

Layout
 
The layout of the digit keys is different from that commonly appearing on calculators and numeric keypads. This layout was chosen after extensive human factors testing at Bell Labs. At the time (late 1950s), mechanical calculators were not widespread, and few people had experience with them. Indeed, calculators were only just starting to settle on a common layout; a 1955 paper states "Of the several calculating devices we have been able to look at... Two other calculators have keysets resembling [the layout that would become the most common layout].... Most other calculators have their keys reading upward in vertical rows of ten," while a 1960 paper, just five years later, refers to today's common calculator layout as "the arrangement frequently found in ten-key adding machines". In any case, Bell Labs testing found that the telephone layout with 1, 2, and 3 in the top row, was slightly faster than the calculator layout with them in the bottom row.

The key labeled ✻ was officially named the "star" key. The key labeled # is officially called the "number sign" key, but other names such as "pound", "hash", "hex", "octothorpe", "gate", "lattice", and "square", are common, depending on national or personal preference. The Greek symbols alpha and omega had been planned originally.

These can be used for special functions. For example, in the UK, users can order a 7:30am alarm call from a BT telephone exchange by dialing: ✻55✻0730#.

Most of the keys also bear letters according to the following system:

These letters have been used for multiple purposes. Originally, they referred to the leading letters of telephone exchange names. In the mid-20th century United States, before the switch to All-Number Calling, telephone numbers had seven digits including a two-digit prefix which was expressed in letters rather than digits, e.g.; KL5-5445. The UK telephone numbering system used a similar two-letter code after the initial zero to form the first part of the subscriber trunk dialling code for a region. For example, Aylesbury was assigned 0AY6, which translated into 0296.

The letters have also been used, mainly in the United States, as a technique for remembering telephone numbers easily. For example, an interior decorator might license the telephone number 1-800-724-6837, but advertise it as the more memorable phoneword 1-800-PAINTER. Sometimes businesses advertise a number with a mnemonic word having more letters than there are digits in the phone number. Usually, this means that the caller just stops dialing at 7 digits after the area code or that the extra digits are ignored by the central office.

In feature phones the letters on the keys are used for text entry tasks such as text messaging, entering names in the phone book, and browsing the web. To compensate for the smaller number of keys, phones used multi-tap and later predictive text processing to speed up the process. Touchscreen phones have made these input methods obsolete, as screens are typically large enough to show as many virtual buttons as necessary for full text entry.

Key tones
Pressing a single key of a traditional analog telephone keypad produces a telephony signaling event to the remote switching system. For touchtone service, the signal is a dual-tone multi-frequency signaling tone consisting of two simultaneous pure tone sinusoidal frequencies. The row in which the key appears determines the low-frequency component, and the column determines the high-frequency component. For example, pressing key 1 results in a signal composed of tones with frequencies 697 hertz (Hz) and 1209 Hz.

Letter mapping

In the course of telephone history, the positions of telephone dials, as well as keypads have been associated with various patterns of mapping letters and characters to numbers (keyboard layout).

The system used in Denmark was different from that used in the U.K., which was different from the U.S. and Australia. The use of alphanumeric codes for exchanges was abandoned in Europe when international direct dialing was introduced in the 1960s, because, for example, dialing VIC 8900 on a Danish telephone would result in a different number to dialling it on a British telephone. At the same time letters were no longer placed on the dials of new telephones.

Letters did not re-appear on phones in Europe until the introduction of mobile phones, and the layout followed the new international standard ITU E.161/ISO 9995-8. The ITU established an international standard (ITU E.161) in the mid-1990s, and that should be the layout used for any new devices. There is a standard, ETSI ES 202 130, that covers European languages and other languages used in Europe, published by the independent ETSI organisation in 2003 and updated in 2007.  Work describing some principles of the standard is available.

Since many newer smartphones, such as the Palm Treo and BlackBerry, have full alphanumeric keyboards instead of the traditional telephone keypads, the user must execute additional steps to dial a number containing convenience letters. On certain BlackBerry devices, a user can press the Alt key, followed by the desired letter, and the device will generate the appropriate DTMF tone.

See also

 E.161
 T9

References

Telephony equipment
Telephone numbers